The Minister for Transport is a member of the Scottish Government who reports to the Cabinet Secretary for Net Zero, Energy and Transport. As a Junior Minister the post holder is not a member of the Scottish Government Cabinet.

Overview 
The current minister is SNP MSP Jenny Gilruth, who was appointed in January 2022.

Responsibilities include:

Energy and energy consents
Renewable energy industries
Connectivity including 100% broadband
Cross government co-ordination on islands

History
From the advent of devolution in 1999 the ministerial portfolios of transport and infrastructure were combined with Environment to form the Minister for Transport and the Environment. From 2000 to 2001, in the government of First Minister Henry McLeish, the environment brief was removed and replaced with planning and the officeholder was styled the Minister for Transport and Planning. The government of First Minister Jack McConnell, from November 2001 to May 2003, combined the transport, planning and infrastructure briefs with economic affairs and further education, headed by the Minister for Enterprise, Transport and Lifelong Learning.

The 2nd McConnell government from 2003, created a cabinet position for transport and infrastructure - the officeholder being titled the Minister for Transport. Following a government reshuffle in 2005, the position was renamed Minister for Transport and Telecommunications.

The government of First Minister Alex Salmond, elected after the May 2007 Scottish general election, reduced the size of the Scottish Cabinet. Overall responsibility for transport, infrastructure, planning and climate change, came under the responsibility of the Cabinet Secretary for Finance and Sustainable Growth, however direct responsibility was vested in the Minister for Transport, Infrastructure and Climate Change, a junior ministerial position within the Scottish Government. In 2010, Climate Change functions were transferred to the junior Environment Minister, with the portfolio becoming Minister for Transport and Infrastructure. After the 2011 Scottish Parliament election, the transport function was given to Alex Neil MSP, as Cabinet Secretary for Infrastructure and Capital Investment.

List of office holders 
The current Minister for Transport is Jenny Gilruth.

See also
Scottish Parliament
Question Time
Scottish Government

References

External links 
 Minister for Energy, Connectivity and the Islands on the Scottish Government website

Energy, Connectivity and the Islands
Energy in Scotland